Daniel Masson is a self-taught composer, musician, producer and performer. Daniel Masson helped to popularize ethnic deep house chill electronic music with the extraordinary wide-reaching success of the Buddha Bar compilations.

Biography
Daniel's early roots in 70's rock guitar seeded his diverse career from creating video game soundtracks, playing jazz music in Paris, France, and composing electronic music for the restored version of The Impossible Voyage the first silent movie by G. Méliès and a collaboration with Goran Bregovic on the Cannes Film Fest prize winning film Queen Margot.

Masson travels the globe to Bangladesh, Syria, Egypt, Morocco recording musicians, sounds and voices from many cultures and counties to weave together the music of place into adventurous and soothing electronic soundscapes.

In the 2016 film documentary and album Walila, Masson travels to Fés Morocco to merge the ancient with the modern to create a cultural bridge between Western and Arab worlds.

At the invitation of French Institute of Fès: Masson performed at Sacred Music Festival of Fès, Morocco, 2016 edition. His album Walila a new music blending electro beats and sounds with the  instruments of Moroccan Traditional Music.

In 2018 Masson released the 3 volumes Trajectories series, inspired by his live mixes experience and continuing the same concept to blend and remix sounds from his library.

In 2019, Masson released Pensées évaporées album, and further in 2020 he released Pacific Dimension E.P.

In 2021, Masson released "Magic Carpet" album following with he released "Dead End" in 2022.

In January 2022, NTS Radio aired an episode dedicated to the music of Daniel Masson.

Discography

As Daniel Masson
Dead End (2022) (Daniel Masson)
Magic Carpet (2021) (Daniel Masson)
Pacific Dimension - EP (2020), (Daniel Masson)
Pensées évaporées (2019), (Daniel Masson)
Trajectories EP Series Vol.1,2,3 (2018), (Daniel Masson)
Walila EP (2016), (Daniel Masson)
Jetlag (2015 Edition), (Daniel Masson)
Ten Particles (2015), (Daniel Masson)
A Tiny Kick in the Brain (2013), (Daniel Masson)
Frequencies (2011), (Daniel Masson)
Adventures (2009), (Daniel Masson)
Buddha Bar Travel Impressions (2008) (Georges V Records)
Trempolino EP (2008), (Daniel Masson)
Bingo EP (2006), (Daniel Masson)
Baul Dimension (2004), (Daniel Masson)

Music for films
The Impossible Voyage of Georges Méliès (Lobster Films, 2011)
 Queen Margot /Patrice Chéreau, 1994
 Mariol Daniel/Kapelian (Exnihilo), 1995
 Tête Creuse (Mac Guff Ligne), 1986
 BBC Documentary "Living the Dream"

Video Game Soundtracks
 Rayman 3: Hoodlum Havoc (GBA) (Ubisoft Entertainment), 2003
 Tom Clancy’s Splinter Cell GBA (Ubisoft Entertainment), 2003
 Sabrina The Teenage Witch GBA  (Ubisoft Entertainment), 2002
 City Racer (Ubisoft Entertainment), 2001
 Bugmonsters (Montparnasse Multimedia France), 2001
 Sethi et le Sorcier Inca (Montparnasse Multimedia France), 2001
 Tristan et le Mystère du Dragon (Montparnasse Multimedia France), 2001
 F1 Racing Championship (Ubisoft Entertainment), 2000
 Jungle Book GBA (Ubisoft Entertainment / Disney Interactive USA), 2000
 Wall Street Trader 2000 (Monte Cristo Multimedia), 2000
 Donald Duck: Goin' Quackers / PC, Nintendo 64, Dreamcast (Disney Interactive USA/Ubisoft Entertainment), 2000
 Donald PK / Ps2 GameCube (Disney Interactive USA/Ubisoft Entertainment), 2000
 Start Up (Montecristo France), 2000
 Les Mouzz (Emme Interactive France), 2000
 Rayman 2 Nintendo (Ubisoft Entertainment), 1999
 Kitchenette (Le Lab France), 1998
 Les 3 Petits Cochons (Dramaera France), 1998
 Monaco Grand Prix (Ubisoft Entertainment), 1998
 Rayman Eveil (Ubisoft Entertainment), 1998
 Rayman Dictée (UbiSoft Entertainment), 1998
 Tim7 (UbiSoft Entertainment), 1998
 Rayman Junior (UbiSoft Entertainment), 1997
 Sean Dundee’s World Club Football (Ubisoft Entertainment), 1997
 F1 Racing Simulation (Ubisoft Entertainment), 1997
 Les 9 Destins de Valdo (Ubisoft Entertainment), 1997
 Pod-Planet of Death (Ubisoft Entertainment), 1997
 1,2,3 Musique (Ubisoft Entertainment), 1996
 Genesia (Microids), 1993

Pacific Islands Collection
 Bora Bora (Océania Records/ Pony Canyon INC.Japan), 2002
 Tonga (Océania Records/ Pony Canyon INC.Japan), 2002
 Tahiti (Océania Records/ Pony Canyon INC.Japan), 2002
 Vanuatu (Océania Records/ Pony Canyon INC.Japan), 2002
 Papouasie Nouvelle Guinée (Océania Records/ Pony Canyon INC.Japan), 2002
 Loyalty Islands (Océania Records/ Pony Canyon INC.Japan), 2002
 Hawaii (Océania Records/ Pony Canyon INC.Japan), 2002
 Les Marquises (Océania Records/ Pony Canyon INC.Japan), 2002
 The Solomon Islands (Océania Records/ Pony Canyon INC.Japan), 2002

As Daniel Masson (Baul Dimension)

Buddha Bar Compilation
 Buddha Bar Greatest Hits (George V Records) 2019
 Buddha Bar Meets French Kitchen & Friends (George V Records), 2018
 Buddha Bar Ultimate Expérience (George V Records), 2016
 A Night @ Buddha-Bar Hotel (George V Records), 2011
 Universal Sound Of Buddha Bar Vol.3 (George V Records), 2009
 Buddha Bar Océan (George V Records), 2008
 Buddha Bar Book (George V Records), 2008
 Buddha Bar Ten Years (George V Records), 2006
 Buddha Bar VI (George V Records), 2004
 Siddharta Spirit Of Buddha Bar vol.2 (George V Records), 2003
 Little Buddha Café (George V Records), 2001

Various Labels Compilations
 Oriental Soul (Compiled by DJ Brahms) - (Cafe De Anatolia) 2020
 Oriental Trip, Vol.3 (Compiled by DJ Brahms)- (Cafe De Anatolia) 2019
 Café Buddha Box Set - Classic Buddha (Park Lane Recordings), 2009
 Tea House 2 (HighNote Records), 2008
 Hotel Buddha (Crazy Diamond Recording), 2007
 Hangzhou China (HighNote Records), 2006
 Purobeach Vol.2 (Seamless), 2006
 Week-End In Ibiza (Water Music Records), 2006
 Lounge Cafe DeLuxe (Park Lane Recordings), 2006
 Dâ-Nang (Quango Music Group), 2005
 Taipei Lounge 2 (HighNote Records), 2005
 Café Solaire (Soulstar), 2005
 Café Nirvana (Park Lane Recordings), 2005
 Cassagrande Ethnica Vol 3 (Métropole Records), 2004
 Jogoya (HighNote Records), 2004
 The Sound Of Milano Fashion 3 (Cool D vision), 2004
 Travel Electro (Atoll Music), 2004
 Buddha-Bar, 2004
 Various Artists Leafage Music (Pony Canyon INC. Japan), 2003
 Wenk (Universal Music), 2003
 Together Barra Mundi 4 (Pchent), 2003
 World Habitat (Habitat), 2003
 Voyage Océanie (Naïve), 2003
 Couleurs Pacifique (Vox Terrae), 2003
 Moana Lounge (Intercontinental Beachcomber Resorts), 2003 
 Sunny Days (MCD World Music), 2003
 Lazy Afternoons (MCD World Music), 2003
 Cool Nights (MCD World Music), 2003
 Undiscovered World 2 (V2), 2003
 The Karma Collection «  Sunrise » (Ministry of Sound), 2002
 Nights In French Satin Vol.2 (HighNote Records), 2002
 Chilled Grooves (Water Music Records), 2002
 Cargo High-Tech (Energy Production Srl), 2002
 Oceanic Fringe (Times Music), 2002
 Paradise (Adequat Music), 2002
 Café del Sol vol.3 (Water Music Records), 2002
 Café Ibiza (Water Music Records), 2002
 Pacific Hotel (Oceania Records), 2002
 Casssagrande Ethnica (Métropole Records), 2002
 In Bloom II A Collection of World Music Produced in France (Bureau Export), 2002
 French Music Popkomm 2001 Koln (Bureau Export De La Musique Française), 2001
 Paradisiac ( Universal Music), 2000
 In Bloom A Collection of French Electronica (Bureau Export), 2000

As Electromana
Electromana-Fashion For Developpement (Pony Canyon Inc. Japan), 2003
Electromana-Jetlag (Georges V Records), 2001

With Others
 Atlantean (Atlantis Recordings), 2006
 Sara Mandiano (WEA Music), 1993
 Philippe Russo (EMI France), 1988
 Jungle Boys (EMI France), 1987

Remixes
 Angelic Voices, B-Tribe on Buddha Bar vol 6 (Georges V Records), 2004
 Breeze, Ratnabali on Siddharta vol 2 (Georges V Records), 2003

Live Mixes
 G. Melies Impossible Voyage at Busan International Film Festival, South Korea, 2017
 Pareidolia Coco Tulum Live Mix, 2017
 Geneva Yoga Music Festival Live Mix, 2017
 London Troubadour Live Mix, 2016 and 2017
 Walila Live at Sacred Music Festival of Fès, 2016
 Geneva Yoga Music Festival in 2012 and 2013

TV and Commercials
 Elastok//French TV La Cinq
 Air France
 Darphin Cosmetics
 Swissair
 Chopard Watches
 Roger & Gallet Cosmetics
 Graal Joaillier

References

External links
Daniel Masson Official Website

Living people
French male composers
French musicians
Year of birth missing (living people)